Luxor 5th Passage (known as Luxor 5) is the "sequel" to Luxor, Luxor 2, Luxor 3, and Luxor: Quest for the Afterlife. It was developed by Absolutist and published by MumboJumbo in the 5th anniversary of the creation of Luxor, the original series.

Gameplay

Adventure
Create matches of three or more spheres. Every third match in a row grants you a powerup. Catch the powerup and it will activate. A number of matches is needed to finish the level. The color are red, green, yellow, blue, purple, white and black, these colors are the same as for Luxor. The level 14-6 is added, because it breaks the record at 84 levels, which adds 14 bonus levels, with the 85% of the completion of every stage, it will upgrade into Double Shooter along with Pharaoh's Daggers. The total levels for Luxor 5th Passage is 98, and 1 special level from Blast mode, and 15 People's Choice awards from Luxor 2, and Luxor 3.

Blast Mode
The player receives 2 minutes to clear all the balls on the level.

People's Choice
The 15 levels in this mode come from popular levels in Luxor 2 and Luxor 3.

References

MacOS games
Video games developed in the United States
Windows games
2010 video games
MumboJumbo games
Tile-matching video games
Video games set in Egypt